Michael Barrett Freeman (born August 4, 1987) is an American former professional baseball utility player. He played in Major League Baseball (MLB) for the Arizona Diamondbacks, Seattle Mariners, Los Angeles Dodgers, Chicago Cubs, Cleveland Indians, and Cincinnati Reds.

Career

Amateur
Freeman attended Edgewater High School in Orlando, Florida. Out of high school he was drafted by the San Diego Padres in the 41st round of the 2006 Major League Baseball draft. He did not sign and played college baseball at Clemson University. In 2008, he played collegiate summer baseball with the Brewster Whitecaps of the Cape Cod Baseball League.

Arizona Diamondbacks
After his junior year he was drafted by the Arizona Diamondbacks in the 36th round of the 2009 MLB Draft but did not sign and returned to Clemson. He was then drafted by the Diamondbacks in the 11th round of the 2010 MLB Draft and signed. Freeman was called up to the majors for the first time on July 17, 2016.

Seattle Mariners
Freeman was claimed off waivers by the Seattle Mariners on August 1, 2016. He was designated for assignment on March 1, 2017.

Los Angeles Dodgers
He was claimed off waivers by the Los Angeles Dodgers on May 26, 2017. The Dodgers designated him for assignment him  on July 31.

Chicago Cubs

On August 6, 2017, Freeman signed a minor league deal with the Chicago Cubs. Freeman ultimately played in 15 games for the Cubs, but was not included on the playoff roster following the season.  He elected free agency on November 6, 2017. On January 25, 2018, Freeman resigned a minor league deal with the Chicago Cubs and received an invitation to spring training. He was designated for assignment after the season and then became a free agent.

Cleveland Indians
Freeman signed a minor-league deal with a spring training invitation with the Cleveland Indians on November 20, 2018. He had his contract selected on April 16, 2019. Freeman was designated for assignment on December 15, 2019 and subsequently outrighted to the minor leagues on December 19, 2019. The Indians selected Freeman's contract on July 23, 2020. Overall with the 2020 Cleveland Indians, Freeman batted .237 with no home runs and 3 RBIs in 24 games. On October 30, 2020, Freeman was outrighted off of the Indians' 40-man roster; he subsequently elected free agency. On February 4, 2021, Freeman re-signed with the Indians on a minor league contract.

Cincinnati Reds
On March 12, 2021, Freeman was traded to the Cincinnati Reds in exchange for cash. He did not make the Reds' opening day roster.  On June 1, Freeman was selected to the active roster. On August 15, Freeman was designated for assignment by the Reds. On August 17, Freeman was sent outright to the Triple-A Louisville Bats. On October 12, Freeman elected free agency.

Coaching career
On January 25, 2023, Freeman was hired by the Seattle Mariners organization to serve as the manager for the Arkansas Travelers, Seattle’s Double-A affiliate.

References

External links

1987 births
Living people
Baseball players from Orlando, Florida
Major League Baseball outfielders
Arizona Diamondbacks players
Seattle Mariners players
Los Angeles Dodgers players
Chicago Cubs players
Cleveland Indians players
Cincinnati Reds players
Clemson Tigers baseball players
Brewster Whitecaps players
Yakima Bears players
South Bend Silver Hawks players
Visalia Rawhide players
Mobile BayBears players
Salt River Rafters players
Reno Aces players
Hillsboro Hops players
Navegantes del Magallanes players
American expatriate baseball players in Venezuela
Tacoma Rainiers players
Oklahoma City Dodgers players
Iowa Cubs players
Columbus Clippers players
Edgewater High School alumni